Sthennis (Greek: Σθέννις) was an Olynthian sculptor from the 4th century BC. He was the son of Herodotus and father of Herodorus, both sculptors as well.

References

4th-century BC Greek sculptors
Ancient Greek sculptors
Ancient Olynthians
Artists of ancient Chalcidice